Hopea semicuneata is a tree in the family Dipterocarpaceae. The specific epithet semicuneata means "half wedge-shaped", referring to the leaf base.

Description
The bark is cracked and flaked.

Distribution and habitat
Hopea semicuneata is native to Peninsular Malaysia, Borneo and Mursala Island, off Sumatra.

Conservation
Hopea semicuneata has been assessed as endangered on the IUCN Red List. It is threatened by land conversion for agricultural plantations. It is also threatened by logging and the addition of logging roads. The species is found in some protected areas.

References

semicuneata
Flora of Borneo
Flora of Peninsular Malaysia
Flora of Sumatra
Plants described in 1934
Taxonomy articles created by Polbot